John Graves (born June 25, 1987) is a former American football defensive tackle who played with the Seattle Seahawks.

Early years
Graves attended Meadowbrook High School, where he was selected to the All-America team by PrepStar and SuperPrep.

College career
Graves played under Frank Beamer at Virginia Tech for five seasons from 2006-2010. Though he initially played at defensive tackle, during the 2009 offseason, coaches Charley Wiles and Bud Foster moved him to defensive end, where he played during his fifth season. Graves was a captain as a senior. Though Graves was regarded by teammates as being somewhat wild, he was described by coach Charley Wiles as being a natural leader and one of a strong work ethic. After Tech's loss to James Madison in 2010, Graves was immediately back in the film room getting ready for the next game.

Professional career
Graves was not selected in the 2011 NFL Draft, but was signed by the Seattle Seahawks as an undrafted free agent. He was waived during final cuts, but did come back to the team on the practice squad for the 2011 season. He was subsequently waived.

References

1987 births
Living people
American football defensive tackles
Houston Texans players
Seattle Seahawks players
Virginia Tech Hokies football players
Players of American football from Richmond, Virginia